The Koyukon are an Alaska Native Athabascan people of the Athabascan-speaking ethnolinguistic group. Their traditional territory is along the Koyukuk and Yukon rivers where they subsisted for thousands of years by hunting and trapping. Many Koyukon live in a similar manner today.

The Koyukon language belongs to a large family called Na-Dené or Athabascan, traditionally spoken by numerous groups of native people throughout northwestern North America. In addition, due to ancient migrations of related peoples, other Na-Dené languages, such as Navajo and Apachean varieties, are spoken in the American Southwest and in Mexico.

History
The first Europeans to enter Koyukon territory were Russians, who came up the Yukon River to Nulato in 1838. When they arrived, they found that items such as iron pots, glass beads, cloth apparel, and tobacco had already reached the people through their trade with coastal Eskimos, who had long traded with Russians. An epidemic of smallpox had preceded them, causing high fatalities in the village. In subsequent years, European infectious diseases drastically reduced the Koyukon population, who had no immunity to these new diseases.

Relative isolation persisted along the Koyukuk until 1898, when the Yukon Gold Rush brought more than a thousand men to the river. They found little gold, and most left the following winter.

Archaeological evidence suggests that the Koyukon people have inhabited their region for at least 1,000 years, with cultural roots there that stretch back thousands of years earlier.

Ethnobotany

The Koyukon freeze lingonberries for winter use.

Notable Koyukon
 Nikoosh Carlo, PhD, scientist and policy advisor. Dr. Carlo served as Senior Advisor, Climate & Arctic Policy to the Governor of Alaska (2017–18), Senior Advisor, U.S. Department of State for the U.S. Chairmanship of the Arctic Council (2015–2017), Public Voices Fellow at the Yale Program on Climate Change Communication and as executive director, Alaska Arctic Policy Commission (2013–2015).
 Poldine Carlo, writer and elder
 Kathleen Carlo-Kendall, professional carver artist
 Mary Jane Fate, activist and leader
 Walter Harper, first man known to reach the summit of Denali (Mount McKinley), in June 1913
 Emil Notti, American engineer, Indigenous activist and Democratic politician
 Michael J. Stickman, First Chief of the Nuwato Tribal Council
 Morris Thompson, businessman and leader

References

Further reading
Hunn, E.S. & Williams, N.M.(Eds.). (1982). Resource Managers: North American and Australian Hunter-Gatherers. Westview Press: Colorado.  Nelson, R.K. “A Conservation Ethic and Environment: The Koykon of Alaska” p. 211-228 Rohrlich, R & Baruch, E. (Ed.). (1984).
Naciente, Esperanza. "Indigenous Lifestyles: Lessons for the Industrialized World." Fighting For Freedom Because A Better World Is Possible Eds. Edgey Wildchild and Esperanza Naciente. New York: Planting Seeds Press. 2006. 121–126.
 Nelson, Richard K. Make Prayers to the Raven: A Koyukon View of the Northern Forest. Chicago: University of Chicago Press, 1986. 
 Nelson, Richard K., Kathleen H. Mautner, and G. Ray Bane. Tracks in the Wildland: A Portrayal of Koyukon and Nunamiut Subsistence. [Fairbanks]: Anthropology and Historic Preservation, Cooperative Park Studies Unit, University of Alaska, Fairbanks, 1982.
 Peter, Adeline. Iñuksuk: Northern Koyukon, Gwich'in & Lower Tanana, 1800-1901. Fairbanks, AK: Alaska Native Knowledge Network, 2001.

External links

Koyukon